is a Japanese professional shogi player ranked 5-dan.

Early life
Ishikawa was born on November 11, 1984, in Kawagoe, Mie. When he was around six years old, he saw his grandfather playing shogi and became interested in the learning how to play. In September 2006, he was accepted into the Japan Shogi Association's apprentice school under the guidance of shogi professional  at the rank of 6-kyū, and was promoted to the rank of apprentice professional 3-dan in April 2013. Ishikawa obtained full professional status and the corresponding rank of 4-dan in October 2019 after finishing in second place in the 65th 3-dan League (April 2019September 2019) with a record of 13 wins and 5 losses.

Promotion history
Ishikawa's promotion history is as follows.
 6-kyū: September 2006
 3-dan: April 2013
 4-dan: October 1, 2019
 5-dan: September 20, 2022

References

External links
ShogiHub: Professional Player Info · Ishilkawa, Yūta

Japanese shogi players
Living people
Professional shogi players
Professional shogi players from Mie Prefecture
1994 births